The Uluguru greenbul (Arizelocichla neumanni) is a species of the bulbul family of passerine birds.  It is found in eastern Tanzania.

Taxonomy and systematics
The Uluguru greenbul was originally described in the genus Arizelocichla in 1922. 

It was then classified to the genus Andropadus before being re-classified back to the genus Arizelocichla in 2010. It was considered conspecific with the mountain greenbul until split to form a separate species in 2009. Some authorities have considered the Uluguru greenbul to be a subspecies of the western greenbul, mountain greenbul or black-browed greenbul. Alternate names for the Uluguru greenbul include the Mulanji mountain greenbul and Uluguru mountain greenbul.

References

Uluguru greenbul
Endemic birds of Tanzania
Uluguru greenbul